Green High School may refer to:
Green County High School, Greensburg, Kentucky
Green High School (Franklin Furnace, Ohio)
Green High School (Green, Ohio)
Hazel Green High School, Hazel Green, Alabama
Newall Green High School, Wythenshawe, England

See also
 Greene High School (disambiguation)